Nadica Stojanova (born 29 June 1994) is a Macedonian footballer who plays as a defender. She has been a member of the North Macedonia women's national team.

References

1994 births
Living people
Women's association football defenders
Macedonian women's footballers
North Macedonia women's international footballers
FK Borec players